The slender shortfaced eel (Panturichthys longus) is an eel in the family Heterenchelyidae (mud eels). It was described by Ernst Ehrenbaum in 1915, originally under the genus Heterenchelys. It is a tropical, marine eel which is known from Benin to Angola in the Gulf of Guinea, in the eastern Atlantic Ocean. Males can reach a maximum total length of 149 centimetres.

References

Heterenchelyidae
Taxa named by Ernst Ehrenbaum
Fish described in 1915